Jean-Pierre Schosteck (born 16 March 1942) is a French politician.  He is mayor of Châtillon and a member of The Republicans.

References

1942 births
Living people
Politicians from Paris
Rally for the Republic politicians
Rally for France politicians
Union for a Popular Movement politicians
Debout la France politicians
The Popular Right
The Republicans (France) politicians
French Senators of the Fifth Republic
Senators of Hauts-de-Seine
Deputies of the 13th National Assembly of the French Fifth Republic
Mayors of places in Île-de-France